General Council elections were held in Mauritania in December 1946; a second round on 5 January was not required as all seats were filled in the first round of voting. The Socialist and Republican Union emerged as the largest party, winning 16 of the 20 seats.

Electoral system
The General Council was elected by two colleges; the first college elected six members and the second fourteen.

Results

References

Elections in Mauritania
Mauritania
1946 in Mauritania
Election and referendum articles with incomplete results